Gov. James Ponder House is a historic home located at Milton, Sussex County, Delaware. It was built about 1875, and is a three-story, five bay, Victorian townhouse. It features a mansard roof and has a center hall plan.  The front facade features a full-width verandah. It was the home of Delaware Governor James Ponder (1819-1897). The building now houses a mortuary and rear additions were made to accommodate that use.

It was added to the National Register of Historic Places in 1973. It is located in the Milton Historic District.

References

Houses on the National Register of Historic Places in Delaware
Houses completed in 1875
Houses in Sussex County, Delaware
National Register of Historic Places in Sussex County, Delaware
Individually listed contributing properties to historic districts on the National Register in Delaware